

Wa 

 Ian Waddell b. 1942 first elected in 1979 as New Democratic Party member for Vancouver Kingsway, British Columbia.
 Jean Casselman Wadds b. 1920 first elected in 1958 as Progressive Conservative member for Grenville—Dundas, Ontario.
 Fletcher Bath Wade b. 1852 first elected in 1900 as Liberal member for Annapolis, Nova Scotia.
 John Chipman Wade b. 1817 first elected in 1878 as Conservative member for Digby, Nova Scotia.
 Cathay Wagantall b. 1956 first elected in 2015 as Conservative member for Yorkton—Melville, Saskatchewan.
 Claude Wagner b. 1925 first elected in 1972 as Progressive Conservative member for Saint-Hyacinthe, Quebec.
 Ian Grant Wahn b. 1916 first elected in 1962 as Liberal member for St. Paul's, Ontario.
 Sam Wakim b. 1937 first elected in 1979 as Progressive Conservative member for Don Valley East, Ontario.
 John Waldie b. 1833 first elected in 1887 as Liberal member for Halton, Ontario.
 David Walker b. 1947 first elected in 1988 as Liberal member for Winnipeg North Centre, Manitoba.
 David James Walker b. 1905 first elected in 1957 as Progressive Conservative member for Rosedale, Ontario.
 Henry Joseph Walker b. 1849 first elected in 1911 as Conservative member for Northumberland East, Ontario.
 James Edgar Walker b. 1911 first elected in 1962 as Liberal member for York Centre, Ontario.
 John Walker b. 1832 first elected in 1874 as Liberal member for London, Ontario.
 David Wardrope Wallace b. 1850 first elected in 1903 as Liberal member for Russell, Ontario.
 John Wallace b. 1812 first elected in 1867 as Liberal member for Albert, New Brunswick.
 John Alexander Wallace b. 1881 first elected in 1921 as Progressive member for Norfolk, Ontario.
 Mike Wallace b. 1963 first elected in 2006 as Conservative member for Burlington, Ontario. 
 Nathaniel Clarke Wallace b. 1844 first elected in 1878 as Conservative member for York West, Ontario.
 Robert Wallace b. 1820 first elected in 1871 as Conservative member for Vancouver Island, British Columbia.
 Thomas George Wallace b. 1879 first elected in 1908 as Conservative member for York Centre, Ontario.
 William Wallace b. 1820 first elected in 1872 as Conservative member for Norfolk South, Ontario.
 Aquila Walsh b. 1823 first elected in 1867 as Conservative member for Norfolk North, Ontario.
 Joseph Charles Walsh b. 1868 first elected in 1906 as Liberal member for St. Anne, Quebec.
 Robert Nelson Walsh b. 1864 first elected in 1904 as Conservative member for Huntingdon, Quebec.
 William Allen Walsh b. 1887 first elected in 1935 as Conservative member for Mount Royal, Quebec.
 Tom Wappel b. 1950 first elected in 1988 as Liberal member for Scarborough West, Ontario.
 Mark Warawa b. 1950 first elected in 2004 as Conservative member for Langley, British Columbia.
 Alexander Bannerman Warburton b. 1852 first elected in 1908 as Liberal member for Queen's, Prince Edward Island.
 Henry Alfred Ward b. 1849 first elected in 1885 as Conservative member for Durham East, Ontario.
 William John Ward b. 1882 first elected in 1921 as Progressive member for Dauphin, Manitoba.
 Chris Warkentin b. 1978 first elected in 2006 as Conservative member for Peace River, Alberta. 
 Daniel Webster Warner b. 1857 first elected in 1921 as Progressive member for Strathcona, Alberta.
 Norman Melvin Warner b. 1943 first elected in 1984 as Progressive Conservative member for Stormont—Dundas, Ontario.
 David Warnock b. 1865 first elected in 1911 as Liberal member for Macleod, Alberta.
 Ralph Melville Warren b. 1882 first elected in 1937 as Liberal member for Renfrew North, Ontario.
 Judy Wasylycia-Leis b. 1951 first elected in 1997 as New Democratic Party member for Winnipeg North Centre, Manitoba.
 Ian Watson b. 1934 first elected in 1963 as Liberal member for Châteauguay—Huntingdon—Laprairie, Quebec.
 Jeff Watson b. 1971 first elected in 2004 as Conservative member for Essex, Ontario.
 Lawrence E. Watson b. 1917 first elected in 1963 as Progressive Conservative member for Assiniboia, Saskatchewan.
 Robert Watson b. 1853 first elected in 1882 as Liberal member for Marquette, Manitoba.
 Robert James Watson b. 1846 first elected in 1904 as Liberal member for Parry Sound, Ontario.
 Dianne Watts b. 1959 first elected in 2015 as Conservative member for South Surrey—White Rock, British Columbia.
 Kevin Waugh b. 1955 first elected in 2015 as Conservative member for Saskatoon—Grasswood, Saskatchewan.
 Elsie Eleanore Wayne b. 1932 first elected in 1993 as Progressive Conservative member for Saint John, New Brunswick.

We 

 David Bennington Weatherhead b. 1928 first elected in 1968 as Liberal member for Scarborough West, Ontario.
 George Dyer Weaver b. 1908 first elected in 1949 as Liberal member for Churchill, Manitoba.
 George Robert Webb b. 1886 first elected in 1945 as Progressive Conservative member for Leeds, Ontario.
 Roderick Arthur Ennis Webb b. 1910 first elected in 1959 as Progressive Conservative member for Hastings—Frontenac, Ontario.
 William Hoste Webb b. 1824 first elected in 1867 as Conservative member for Richmond—Wolfe, Quebec.
 Len Webber b. 1960 first elected in 2015 as Conservative member for Calgary Confederation, Alberta. 
 Allan Ross Webster b. 1903 first elected in 1958 as Progressive Conservative member for Saint-Antoine—Westmount, Quebec.
 Arnold Alexander Webster b. 1899 first elected in 1962 as New Democratic Party member for Vancouver Kingsway, British Columbia.
 John Webster b. 1856 first elected in 1911 as Conservative member for Brockville, Ontario.
 John Aaron Weese b. 1891 first elected in 1930 as Conservative member for Prince Edward—Lennox, Ontario.
 Oscar William Weichel b. 1894 first elected in 1958 as Progressive Conservative member for Waterloo North, Ontario.
 William George Weichel b. 1870 first elected in 1911 as Conservative member for Waterloo North, Ontario.
 Patrick Weiler b. 1986 first elected in 2019 as Liberal member for West Vancouver—Sunshine Coast—Sea to Sky Country, British Columbia. 
 Gérard Weiner b. 1933 first elected in 1984 as Progressive Conservative member for Dollard, Quebec.
 Erin Weir b. 1982 first elected in 2015 as New Democratic Party member for Regina—Lewvan, Saskatchewan.
 Robert Weir b. 1882   first elected in 1930 as Conservative member for Melfort, Saskatchewan.
 William Gilbert Weir b. 1896 first elected in 1930 as Liberal-Progressive member for Macdonald, Manitoba.
 John William Welbourn b. 1900 first elected in 1949 as Liberal member for Jasper—Edson, Alberta.
 Charles Wesley Weldon b. 1830 first elected in 1878 as Liberal member for City and County of St. John, New Brunswick.
 Richard Chapman Weldon b. 1849 first elected in 1887 as Conservative member for Albert, New Brunswick.
 Derek Wells b. 1946 first elected in 1993 as Liberal member for South Shore, Nova Scotia.
 James Pearson Wells b. 1822 first elected in 1867 as Liberal member for York North, Ontario.
 Rupert Mearse Wells b. 1835 first elected in 1882 as Liberal member for Bruce East, Ontario.
 William Welsh b. 1822 first elected in 1887 as Independent Liberal member for Queen's County, Prince Edward Island.
 Robert Wenman b. 1940 first elected in 1974 as Progressive Conservative member for Fraser Valley West, British Columbia.
 Jules Wermenlinger b. 1888 first elected in 1935 as Conservative member for Verdun, Quebec.
 Anton Weselak b. 1918 first elected in 1953 as Liberal member for Springfield, Manitoba.
 John Weston b. 1958 first elected in 2008 as Conservative member for West Vancouver—Sunshine Coast—Sea to Sky Country, British Columbia. 
 Rodney Weston b. 1964 first elected in 2008 as Conservative member for Saint John, New Brunswick.

Wh 
 Nick Whalen b. 1973 first elected in 2015 as Liberal member for St. John's East, Newfoundland and Labrador. 
 Eugene Whelan b. 1924 first elected in 1962 as Liberal member for Essex South, Ontario.
 Susan Whelan b. 1963 first elected in 1993 as Liberal member for Essex—Windsor, Ontario.
 George Wheler b. 1836 first elected in 1878 as Liberal member for Ontario North, Ontario.
 Ross Whicher b. 1918 first elected in 1968 as Liberal member for Bruce, Ontario.
 Howard Primrose Whidden b. 1871 first elected in 1917 as Unionist member for Brandon, Manitoba.
 Arthur Walter Adams White b. 1907 first elected in 1953 as Liberal member for Waterloo South, Ontario.
 Brian White b. 1951 first elected in 1984 as Progressive Conservative member for Dauphin—Swan River, Manitoba.
 George Stanley White b. 1897 first elected in 1940 as National Government member for Hastings—Peterborough, Ontario.
 Gerald Verner White b. 1879 first elected in 1906 as Conservative member for Renfrew North, Ontario.
 Harry Oliver White b. 1895 first elected in 1945 as Progressive Conservative member for Middlesex East, Ontario.
 John White b. 1833 first elected in 1871 as Conservative member for Hastings East, Ontario.
 John White b. 1811 first elected in 1867 as Liberal member for Halton, Ontario.
 John Franklin White b. 1863 first elected in 1921 as Conservative member for London, Ontario.
 Nathaniel Whitworth White b. 1837 first elected in 1891 as Liberal-Conservative member for Shelburne, Nova Scotia.
 Peter White b. 1838 first elected in 1874 as Conservative member for Renfrew North, Ontario.
 Randy White b. 1948 first elected in 1993 as Reform member for Fraser Valley West, British Columbia.
 Robert Smeaton White b. 1856 first elected in 1888 as Conservative member for Cardwell, Ontario.
 Ted White b. 1949 first elected in 1993 as Reform member for North Vancouver, British Columbia.
 Thomas White b. 1830 first elected in 1878 as Conservative member for Cardwell, Ontario.
 William Henry White b. 1865 first elected in 1908 as Liberal member for Victoria, Alberta.
 William Thomas White b. 1866 first elected in 1911 as Conservative member for Leeds, Ontario.
 Joseph Whitehead b. 1814 first elected in 1867 as Liberal member for Huron North, Ontario.
 Harry B. Whiteside b. 1909 first elected in 1949 as Liberal member for Swift Current, Saskatchewan.
 Dean Waldon Whiteway b. 1944 first elected in 1974 as Progressive Conservative member for Selkirk, Manitoba.
 Rutherford Lester Whiting b. 1930 first elected in 1968 as Liberal member for Halton, Ontario.
 Frederick Primrose Whitman b. 1896 first elected in 1940 as Liberal member for Mount Royal, Quebec.
 George H. Whittaker b. 1919 first elected in 1972 as Progressive Conservative member for Okanagan Boundary, British Columbia.
 John R. Whittaker b. 1944 first elected in 1988 as New Democratic Party member for Okanagan—Similkameen—Merritt, British Columbia.

Wi 

 William Hannum Wightman b. 1929 first elected in 1979 as Progressive Conservative member for Scarborough West, Ontario.
 Lewis Wigle b. 1845 first elected in 1882 as Conservative member for Essex South, Ontario.
 Rupert Wilson Wigmore b. 1873 first elected in 1917 as Unionist member for St. John—Albert, New Brunswick.
 Godfrey Stanley Wilbee b. 1932 first elected in 1988 as Progressive Conservative member for Delta, British Columbia.
 Oliver James Wilcox b. 1869 first elected in 1909 as Conservative member for Essex North, Ontario.
 Bryon Wilfert b. 1952 first elected in 1997 as Liberal member for Oak Ridges, Ontario.
 Robert Wilkes b. 1832 first elected in 1872 as Liberal member for Toronto Centre, Ontario.
 Jonathan Wilkinson b. 1965 first elected in 2015 as Liberal member for North Vancouver, British Columbia.
 David Wilks b. 1959 first elected in 2011 as Conservative member for Kootenay—Columbia, British Columbia. 
 Arthur Henry Williams b. 1894 first elected in 1948 as Cooperative Commonwealth Federation member for Ontario, Ontario.
 Arthur Trefusis Heneage Williams b. 1837 first elected in 1878 as Conservative member for Durham East, Ontario.
 John G. Williams b. 1946 first elected in 1993 as Reform member for St. Albert, Alberta.
 John Williamson b. 1970 first elected in 2011 as Conservative member for New Brunswick Southwest, New Brunswick. 
 Ryan Williams first elected in 2021 as Conservative member for Bay of Quinte, Ontario.
 Errick French Willis b. 1896 first elected in 1930 as Progressive Conservative member for Souris, Manitoba.
 Charles James McNeil Willoughby b. 1894 first elected in 1963 as Progressive Conservative member for Kamloops, British Columbia.
 Crowell Willson b. 1815 first elected in 1867 as Liberal-Conservative member for Middlesex East, Ontario.
 Robert Duncan Wilmot b. 1837 first elected in 1887 as Conservative member for Sunbury, New Brunswick.
Blair Wilson b. 1963 first elected in 2006 as Liberal member for West Vancouver—Sunshine Coast—Sea to Sky Country, British Columbia. 
 Charles Avila Wilson b. 1869 first elected in 1908 as Liberal member for Laval, Quebec.
 Geoff Wilson b. 1941 first elected in 1984 as Progressive Conservative member for Swift Current—Maple Creek, Saskatchewan.
 Gordon Crooks Wilson b. 1872 first elected in 1911 as Conservative member for Wentworth, Ontario.
 James Crocket Wilson b. 1841 first elected in 1887 as Liberal-Conservative member for Argenteuil, Quebec.
 James Robert Wilson b. 1866 first elected in 1917 as Unionist member for Saskatoon, Saskatchewan.
 John Henry Wilson b. 1834 first elected in 1882 as Liberal member for Elgin East, Ontario.
 Lawrence Alexander Wilson b. 1863 first elected in 1925 as Liberal member for Vaudreuil—Soulanges, Quebec.
 Michael Holcombe Wilson b. 1937 first elected in 1979 as Progressive Conservative member for Etobicoke Centre, Ontario.
 Norman Frank Wilson b. 1876 first elected in 1904 as Liberal member for Russell, Ontario.
 Uriah Wilson b. 1841 first elected in 1887 as Conservative member for Lennox, Ontario.
 Jody Wilson-Raybould b. 1971 first elected in 2015 as Liberal member for Vancouver Granville, British Columbia.
 Herbert Earl Wilton b. 1869 first elected in 1935 as Conservative member for Hamilton West, Ontario.
 Harold Edward Winch b. 1907 first elected in 1953 as Cooperative Commonwealth Federation member for Vancouver East, British Columbia.
 William C. Winegard b. 1924 first elected in 1984 as Progressive Conservative member for Guelph, Ontario.
 Eric Alfred Winkler b. 1920 first elected in 1957 as Progressive Conservative member for Grey—Bruce, Ontario.
 Howard Winkler b. 1891 first elected in 1935 as Liberal member for Lisgar, Manitoba.
 Robert Henry Winters b. 1910 first elected in 1945 as Liberal member for Queens—Lunenburg, Nova Scotia.
 John Wise b. 1935 first elected in 1972 as Progressive Conservative member for Elgin, Ontario.
 John Philip Wiser b. 1825 first elected in 1878 as Liberal member for Grenville South, Ontario.
 Andrew Witer b. 1946 first elected in 1984 as Progressive Conservative member for Parkdale—High Park, Ontario.
 Henry Buckingham Witton b. 1831 first elected in 1872 as Conservative member for Hamilton, Ontario.

Wo 
 Alice Wong b. 1948 first elected in 2008 as Conservative member for Richmond, British Columbia. 
 Andrew Trew Wood b. 1826 first elected in 1874 as Liberal member for Hamilton, Ontario.
 Bob Wood b. 1940 first elected in 1988 as Liberal member for Nipissing, Ontario.
 Donald Paul Wood b. 1933 first elected in 1977 as Liberal member for Malpeque, Prince Edward Island.
 Edmund Burke Wood b. 1820 first elected in 1867 as Liberal member for Brant South, Ontario.
 George Ernest Wood b. 1888 first elected in 1935 as Liberal member for Brant, Ontario.
 John Fisher Wood b. 1852 first elected in 1882 as Liberal-Conservative member for Brockville, Ontario.
 Josiah Wood b. 1843 first elected in 1882 as Conservative member for Westmorland, New Brunswick.
 Robert James Wood b. 1886 first elected in 1949 as Liberal member for Norquay, Manitoba.
 Robert John Woods b. 1859 first elected in 1921 as Progressive member for Dufferin, Ontario.
 James Shaver Woodsworth b. 1874 first elected in 1921 as Labour member for Winnipeg Centre, Manitoba.
 Douglas Benjamin Woodworth b. 1841 first elected in 1882 as Liberal-Conservative member for Kings, Nova Scotia.
 Stephen Woodworth b. 1954 first elected in 2008 as Conservative member for Kitchener Centre, Ontario. 
 Eldon Woolliams b. 1916 first elected in 1958 as Progressive Conservative member for Bow River, Alberta.
 Thomas Workman b. 1813 first elected in 1867 as Liberal member for Montreal Centre, Quebec.
 Arthur Norreys Worthington b. 1862 first elected in 1904 as Conservative member for Town of Sherbrooke, Quebec.
 Dave Worthy b. 1934 first elected in 1988 as Progressive Conservative member for Cariboo—Chilcotin, British Columbia.

Wr 

 Jack Wratten b. 1906 first elected in 1957 as Progressive Conservative member for Brantford, Ontario.
 Aaron Abel Wright b. 1840 first elected in 1900 as Liberal member for Renfrew South, Ontario.
 Alonzo Wright b. 1825 first elected in 1867 as Liberal-Conservative member for County of Ottawa, Quebec.
 Amos Wright b. 1809 first elected in 1868 as Liberal member for York West, Ontario.
 David McKenzie Wright b. 1874 first elected in 1925 as Conservative member for Perth North, Ontario.
 Frederick Wright b. 1933 first elected in 1980 as Progressive Conservative member for Calgary North, Alberta.
 Henry Oswald Wright b. 1880 first elected in 1917 as Unionist member for Battleford, Saskatchewan.
 Percy Ellis Wright b. 1892 first elected in 1940 as Cooperative Commonwealth Federation member for Melfort, Saskatchewan.
 William Wright b. 1853 first elected in 1904 as Conservative member for Muskoka, Ontario.
 William McKay Wright b. 1840 first elected in 1872 as Liberal-Conservative member for Pontiac, Quebec.
 Borys Wrzesnewskyj b. 1960 first elected in 2004 as Liberal member for Etobicoke Centre, Ontario.

Wy 

 William Duncan Wylie b. 1900 first elected in 1945 as Social Credit member for Medicine Hat, Alberta.

W